Mel Brock may refer to:

 Mel Brock (athlete) (1888–1956), Canadian sprinter and middle-distance runner
 Mel Brock (footballer) (1916–2000), Australian rules footballer